Marnia Airfield is an abandoned military airfield in Morocco, located approximately 9 km west of Tangier and 37 km north-northeast of Asilah.

History
The airfield was constructed as a temporary facility, with a hard earth or pierced steel planking (PSP) runway and parking apron. with few or no permanent structures, Tents were used for ground support operations and personnel billeting.   It was used for a brief two-week period by the Twelfth Air Force 86th Bombardment Group, flying A-20 Havocs from the field in early and mid-June 1943 during the North African Campaign.  After the 86th moved east to Tafaraoui Airfield, Algeria, the airfield was dismantled and the land returned to civil authorities.

Today the area where Marnia Airfield was constructed is now an agricultural area, with little or no evidence of its existence.

References

 Maurer, Maurer. Air Force Combat Units of World War II. Maxwell AFB, Alabama: Office of Air Force History, 1983. .

External links

Airfields of the United States Army Air Forces in Morocco
World War II airfields in Morocco